Staphorst is a municipality and a town in the eastern Netherlands.

History

The villages of Staphorst and its southern neighbour Rouveen came into existence as in the 13th century monks started to bring the bogs and swamps into culture.

All the farms were built along the long road through the bog area. This phenomenon is called in Dutch: lintbebouwing (ribbon urbanization). In many parts of the Netherlands this type of village is quite common, e.g. Vriezenveen, the villages along river dykes in the Netherlands, the so-called moor-colonies in the provinces Drenthe and Groningen, as well as the German regions opposite the border.

According to the website goDutch.com in the section of "Excerpts from the Windmill" in the entry for "Staphorst reunion organizers eager to welcome former residents for April 2011 municipal bicentennial", Staphorst was a Dutch municipality, created through a decree by French emperor Napoleon who merged four smaller entities into a much larger one.  The 1811 decree merged the villages of Rouveen, Staphorst and IJhorst along with nearby sparsely populated Hasselter schoutambt (a judicial entity) into a municipality, known since 1818 as Staphorst.  Except for a few minor changes, Staphorst's borders have remained unchanged, making it an anomaly in Dutch municipal history.

A specialty for Staphorst is, that after a farmer's death, his land was often divided between his sons. The son who did not inherit his father's farm built a farm-house for his own behind the other. Therefore, many pieces of farmland are very lengthy, yet narrow (e.g. 1500 x 40 metres). Originally, each piece of land was 125 metres wide.

The farms are of the traditional Low Saxon type. They have green doors and window shutters. Most farms existing now were built between 1850 and 1910.

Society
Staphorst is still a largely orthodox Calvinist village and has one of the highest church attendancy rates of the Netherlands. In 1971, Staphorst became world news due to an outbreak of polio. 39 people (mostly children) became infected with polio. Of these, five died and a number of others became disabled. 20% of residents remain unvaccinated for religious reasons. As a result, Staphorst and other similar areas in the Netherlands are classified as risk areas by the WHO  – the only such area in Europe.

The Total Fertility Rate (TFR) in Staphorst at 2.76 was 4th highest in all of Netherlands in 2003. That makes Staphorst a place with one of the highest birth rates in all of Europe.

Population centres

Demographics 
Staphorst had a sustainable birth rate until the beginning of 21st century. But during the 2000–2007 period, the birth rate dropped considerably. 
Birth Rate: 15.79 per 1000 (down from 18.96 in 2000).
Death Rate: 6.98 per 1000.
NGR: +0.88%

The birth rate of Staphorst declined further to 14,9‰ in 2016, while the total fertility rate declined to 2,65 children per woman.

Notable people 

 Lambertus Johannes Hansen (1803 in Staphorst – 1859) Dutch painter
 Tjerk Vermaning (1929 in Staphorst – 1986) a controversial Dutch amateur archaeologist
 Roelof Bisschop (born 1956 in Staphorst) a Dutch historian and politician

Sport 
 Marc Houtzager (born 1971 in Rouveen) a Dutch show jumping equestrian, silver medallist at the 2012 Summer Olympics
 Bert Konterman (born 1971 in Rouveen) former professional footballer with 470 club caps
 Gretha Smit (born 1976 in Rouveen) a Dutch former speed skater, silver medallist in the 2002 Winter Olympics

Gallery

References

External links

Tourist Office of Staphorst

 
Municipalities of Overijssel
Populated places in Overijssel
Kop van Overijssel
Salland